The Upper Lakes Shipping Company was a Canadian shipping company that maintained a fleet of lake freighters on the North American Great Lakes from 1931 to 2011.
The company was privately owned.
In February 2011 the company sold its fleet to Algoma Central.

References

Shipping companies of Canada
Great Lakes Shipping Companies